The 1940 Southern California Conference football season was the season of college football played by the five member schools of the Southern California Conference (SCC) as part of the 1940 college football season.

The Redlands Bulldogs, led by head coach Cecil A. Cushman, won the SCC championship with a 4–4–1 record (3–0–1 against SCC opponents).

The Pomona Sagehens , led by head coach Earl J. Merritt, finished in second place with a 4–4 record (3–1 against SCC opponents).

Conference overview

Teams

Redlands

The 1940 Redlands Bulldogs football team that represented the University of Redlands of Redlands, California. In their 11th season under head coach Cecil A. Cushman, the team compiled a 4–4–1 record (3–0–1 against SCC opponents), won the SCC championship, and outscored opponents by a total of 115 to 83.

Three Redlands players were selected by Ray Canton for first-team, all-conference honors: halfback Alvin Chang; guard Herb Morelli; and center John Hoffman.

The team played its home games at Orange Show Stadium in San Bernardino, California.

Pomona

The 1940 Pomona Sagehens football team that represented Pomona College of Pomona, California. In their sixth season under head coach Earl J. Merritt, the Sagehens compiled a 4–4 record (3–1 against SCC opponents), finished in second place in the SCC, and were outscored by a total of 139 to 83.

Two Pomona players received first-team honors on the all-conference team: halfback Fred Stuedler and end Dick Strehle.

Occidental

The 1940 Occidental Tigers football team that represented Occidental College of Los Angeles, California. In their first season under head coach Gus Henderson, the Tigers compiled a 3–4–1 record (2–2 against SCC opponents), finished in third place in the SCC, and were outscored by a total of 91 to 58.

Three Occidental players received first-team honors on the all-conference team: back Keith Beebe; end Morgan Odell; and tackle Burt Jones.

Whittier

The 1940 Whittier Poets football team that represented Whittier College of Whittier, California. In their 12th season under head coach Wallace Newman, the team compiled a 2–6–1 record (1–2–1 against SCC opponents), finished in fourth place in the SCC, and were outscored by a total of 110 to 39.

Two Whittier players received first-team honors on the all-conference team: tackle Ralph Garman and guard Fred Shaheen.

Caltech

The 1946 Caltech Beavers football team that represented the California Institute of Technology of Pasadena, California. In their 20th year under head coach Fox Stanton, the Beavers compiled a 2–5–1 record (0–4 against SCC opponents), finished in last place in the SCC, and were outscored by a total of 154 to 48.

Caltech fullback Stan Sohler received first-team honors on the all-conference team.

All-conference selections
Ray Canton in The Whittier News selected the following first-team players to the All-Southern California Conference football team:

 Back - Keith Beebe, Occidental
 Halfbacks - Alvin Chang, Redlands; Fred Stuedler, Pomona
 Fullback - Stan Sohler, Caltech
 Ends - Dick Strehle, Pomona; Morgan Odell, Occidental
 Tackles - Burt Jones, Occidental; Ralph Garman, Whittier
 Guards - Herb Morelli, Redlands; Fred Shaheen, Whittier
 Center - John Hoffman, Redlands

References